Rabah Khelidi (born 18 January 1977) is an Algerian professional football player who currently plays  as a midfielder for Algerian Ligue 2 club RC Kouba. Khelidi was taken to the Court of Arbitration for Sport in a case which showed that he began his career with a false name 'Samir Khelidi'.

Club career

RC Kouba
Khelidi began his football career as a junior in 1995. In 2002 Khelidi was transferred under to OMR El Annasser.

Olympique de Médéa
In the summer of 2010, Khelidi signed a contract for O Médéa.

References

External links

1977 births
Living people
Algerian footballers
Olympique de Médéa players
Algerian Ligue 2 players
OMR El Annasser players
People from Kouba
Association football midfielders
21st-century Algerian people